Jacques Serguine (born 1935) is a French writer and essayist.

Biography 
Born in 1935, Jacques Serguine, pen name of Jacques Gouzerh, lived and worked in Avon near Fontainebleau. He was noticed very young by Jean Paulhan who published his first texts in La Nouvelle Revue française. In 1959, his first novel, Les Fils de Rois, inaugurated the series "Le Chemin" (Gallimard) directed by Georges Lambrichs, obtained the Prix Fénéon and missed the Prix Médicis by one vote behind Claude Mauriac. Assimilated to the literary movement of the Hussards, he will decline the invitation by political convictions. His fourth novel Mano l'Archange, although unanimously hailed by the critic whose first defender was Kleber Haedens, was banned from sale for "harm to good morals".

On the sidelines of a noted literary work and devoted to the sensual aspect of human relations, Jacques Serguine is also the author of the famous Cruelle Zélande and Éloge de la fessée (Folio Gallimard) which has been said to have given their letters of nobility to this erotic fantasy. He is also the author of the original screenplay of the film A Very Curious Girl by Nelly Kaplan.

Novels 
1959: Les Fils de rois, Éditions Gallimard
1960: Le Petit Hussard, Gallimard
1962: Les Saints innocents, Gallimard, Prix Fénéon
1962: Mano l'Archange, Gallimard
1963: Les Falaises d'or, Gallimard
1964: Manuel et Gentille, Gallimard
1967: Les Jours, Flammarion
1969: Les Barbares, Gallimard
1970: La Mort confuse, Gallimard
1971: Les abois, Gallimard
1975: Les Russes et les Bretons, Gallimard
1978: Cruelle Zélande, Jean-Jacques Pauvert
1985: Je suis de la nation du loup, 
1989: Je n'ai pas fini de t'aimer aujourd'hui, Éditions Belfond
1992: La Maison de l'Avenida, Belfond
1992: La Culotte de feuilles, JC Lattès
1994: Istambul Loti, Lattès
1998: Délit du corps, Le Cercle
2003: La Peau du chagrin, Éditions du Rocher
2006: L'Été des jeunes filles, Mercure de France
2007: L'Attendrisseur, Blanche

Essays 
1973: Éloge de la fessée, Gallimard
1988: Contradictionnaire, Le Cherche midi
1989: L'Odeur de sainteté, Éditions Le Pré aux clercs
2002: Un stylo à bile, Le Cherche midi

Notices 
2000: Encyclopédie du Sadomasochisme (p. 350.351). 
2005: Dictionnaire de la pornographie (p. 562). Dir. Philippe Di Folco, P.U.F

Extract 
"If writing is the sine qua non medium of the writer, the man of letters has a career, I am a writer, I have always been, good or bad, it belongs to others to decide. I write because I have no other way to speak. I do not like the attendance of other writers on the whole. My friends say that I am an uncouth bear, an animal which, with time, has become my totem, so I always lived on the fringe of the literary milieu". Écrire l'Éros, interviews with Stéphan Lévy-Kuentz, Blanche 2004)

References

External links 
 Jacques Serguine on Babelio
 Jacques Serguine on Goodreads

20th-century French novelists
20th-century French essayists
Prix Fénéon winners
1935 births
Living people